Mykola Viktorovych Avilov (born 6 August 1948) is a retired Ukrainian Soviet decathlete (Odessa) who competed at the 1968, 1972 and 1976 Olympics. He won a gold medal in 1972, setting a new world record, a bronze in 1976, and finished fourth in 1968.

Unusually tall for his time Avilov first played basketball, then changed to high jump in 1962, and only in 1966 turned to decathlon. He won that event at the 1970 Universiade and finished second in 1973. In 1971 he married Valentyna Kozyr, an Olympic high jumper. Avilov retired in 1980 after finishing fifth at the Soviet Championships. He then coached athletics in Ukraine, Iraq, China, Egypt and the Seychelles.

In the 2015 Odessa regional election Avilov was elected into the Odessa Oblast parliament as the first of the Petro Poroshenko Bloc's election ballot.

References

1948 births
Living people
Ukrainian decathletes
Honoured Masters of Sport of the USSR
Recipients of the Order of the Red Banner of Labour
Olympic athletes of the Soviet Union
Olympic gold medalists for the Soviet Union
Olympic bronze medalists for the Soviet Union
Athletes (track and field) at the 1968 Summer Olympics
Athletes (track and field) at the 1972 Summer Olympics
Athletes (track and field) at the 1976 Summer Olympics
Soviet decathletes
Sportspeople from Odesa
Dynamo sports society athletes
Medalists at the 1976 Summer Olympics
Medalists at the 1972 Summer Olympics
Local politicians in Ukraine
Petro Poroshenko Bloc politicians
Olympic gold medalists in athletics (track and field)
Olympic bronze medalists in athletics (track and field)
Universiade medalists in athletics (track and field)
Universiade gold medalists for the Soviet Union
Universiade silver medalists for the Soviet Union
Medalists at the 1970 Summer Universiade
Medalists at the 1973 Summer Universiade